My Man Adam is a 1985 American comedy film directed by Roger L. Simon and co-written by Simon and Renée Missel.

Plot
High schooler Adam Swit (Raphael Sbarge) constantly daydreams about the same beautiful girl. Soon new student Sabrina McKay (Page Hannah) shows up who's identical to the girl of his dreams. Struggling to win her over, he doesn't do so well until a complex conspiracy throws them both into potential peril.

Principal cast

References

External links 

1986 films
1980s sex comedy films
1980s teen comedy films
American coming-of-age comedy films
American sex comedy films
American teen comedy films
1980s English-language films
Films shot in San Diego
TriStar Pictures films
Films scored by Sylvester Levay
1986 directorial debut films
1985 comedy films
1985 films
1986 comedy films
1980s American films